The pale fork-marked lemur (Phaner pallescens), or western fork-marked lemur, is known from western Madagascar; south of the Fiherenana River to the region of Soalala. It is listed on CITES Appendix I.

References

Lemurs
Mammals described in 1991
Taxa named by Colin Groves
Taxa named by Ian Tattersall